Laura Walker (born November 19, 1990 as Laura Crocker) is a Canadian curler from Edmonton, Alberta. She is a two-time Canadian University champion, a national junior champion, world junior silver medallist and world mixed doubles bronze medallist. Walker is originally from Scarborough, Ontario.

Career

Juniors
Walker began her junior curling career as a skip. In 2008, her Scarboro Golf & Country Club rink made it to the provincial junior championships where her team finished with a 2–5 record. In 2010, Walker was invited to join the Rachel Homan junior rink at the second position. The team's regular second, Alison Kreviazuk, was too old to play in juniors that season (but played with the team in World Curling Tour events). The rink would win the provincial championship and the 2010 Canadian Junior Curling Championships, and would then make it to the final of the 2010 World Junior Curling Championships where they lost to Sweden. The following season, Walker and lead Lynn Kreviazuk joined up with the Clancy Grandy junior rink. With Grandy, Walker won her second straight provincial championship but finished with a 5–7 record at the 2011 Canadian Junior Curling Championships, missing the playoffs.

While Walker was finding success with her junior career, she also found success representing Sir Wilfrid Laurier University as a university curler, where she attended school from 2008–2012. Walker won the 2011 CIS/CCA Curling Championships defeating Brock University in the final. In her final year at Laurier, Walker would repeat her championship, winning in the final of the 2012 CIS/CCA Curling Championships against Brock once again. Walker graduated that year from Laurier with a BA in Psychology.

Women's
Following the 2011–12 season, Walker and teammates Sarah Wilkes and Jen Gates moved from Ontario to curl out of Edmonton, Alberta where they were joined by Albertan Rebecca Pattison. Walker played in her first WCT Grand Slam event at the 2012 Curlers Corner Autumn Gold Curling Classic, where her team lost in the quarter-finals. At the second Grand Slam of the season, the Crocker rink repeated that success by finishing in the quarterfinals of the 2012 Manitoba Lotteries Women's Curling Classic. However at the next Slam, the 2012 Colonial Square Ladies Classic her team would miss out at the quarters, by losing in the round of 16. At the 2012 Masters Grand Slam of Curling, the rink went 0–5. The team qualified for the 2013 Alberta Scotties Tournament of Hearts, Crocker's first provincial women's championship appearance. The team began the tournament with four straight victories, but lost both of their playoff games. To wrap up the season, the Crocker rink made it to the quarter finals of the 2013 Players' Championship. After the season, Wilkes became the team's alternate and was replaced by Erin Carmody at third.

To start the 2013–14 season, the Crocker team played in both the 2013 Curlers Corner Autumn Gold Curling Classic and the 2013 Manitoba Liquor & Lotteries Women's Classic, failing to make the playoffs in either event. Her team played in the 2013 Canadian Olympic Curling Pre-Trials, winning two games, but not qualifying for the Olympic Trials. Next, Walker played in the 2013 Winter Universiade with her Laurier University rink which included Wilkes, Gates and lead Cheryl Kreviazuk. She would lead the team to a 4–5 record, missing the playoffs. Walker finished the season by playing third for Val Sweeting at the 2014 Players' Championship, where they would miss the playoffs.

Effective as of March 11, 2014, the team announced that Chelsea Carey would take over as skip of the team. Walker would move to third and Gates would remain at lead. Wilkes has left the team. Taylor McDonald was recruited to play second for the team, while Carmody left the team. The team would win two tour titles that season, the HDF Insurance Shoot-Out and the Boundary Ford Curling Classic. The team played in three slams that season, making the playoffs in only the 2014 Canadian Open of Curling, where they lost in the quarterfinals. At the 2015 Alberta Scotties Tournament of Hearts, the team would lose in the finals.

Following the 2014–15 season, Carey formed a new team, and was replaced by Kelsey Rocque as the team's skip. In their first season together, the Rocque rink won the Red Deer Curling Classic and the CCT Uiseong Masters on the tour. The team played in five slams, making it to the quarterfinals in four events. Team Rocque played in the 2016 Alberta Scotties Tournament of Hearts, but failed to make the playoffs. The team also played in the 2015 Canada Cup of Curling, but finished with a 2–4 record, missing the playoffs. The following season, the team had less success on the tour. They would play in four slams, making it to the quarterfinals in just one event, the 2016 GSOC Tour Challenge. The team played in the 2016 Canada Cup of Curling, but once again missed the playoffs with a 2–4 record. In the 2017–18 season, Team Rocque would win the Curl Mesabi Classic and would play in three slams, making it to the quarterfinals at just the 2018 Meridian Canadian Open. The team played in the 2017 Canadian Olympic Curling Pre-Trials, losing in the playoffs. Midway through the season, Walker took over skipping duties of the team, but remained throwing third stones. The Rocque rink played with the new arrangement at the 2018 Alberta Scotties Tournament of Hearts, where they narrowly missed the playoffs. The next month it was announced that the team would be splitting up. In their final event together, with Rocque off the team, the rink would lose in a tiebreaker at the 2018 Players' Championship with Walker skipping and Kendra Lilly brought in to play third.

For the 2018–19 season, Walker skipped a new team of Cathy Overton-Clapham, Lori Olson-Johns and Laine Peters. They played in four of seven Slams and were knocked out of the 2019 Alberta Scotties Tournament of Hearts 9–2 by Jodi Marthaller. Outside of her team, Walker spared in two other Grand Slam events. She replaced Joanne Courtney on Team Homan at the Players' Championship partway through the event and replaced Allison Flaxey at skip for her team at the 2019 Champions Cup, where they had a quarterfinal finish.

On March 15, 2019, it was announced that Walker was once again skipping a new team of Kate Cameron, Taylor McDonald and Nadine Scotland for the 2019–20 season. They did not qualify for the playoffs in their first two events, the 2019 Cargill Curling Training Centre Icebreaker and the Booster Juice Shoot-Out before winning the 2019 Mother Club Fall Curling Classic after posting a perfect 7–0 record. Walker won her first provincial title this season as well, defeating former teammate Kelsey Rocque 7–4 in the 2020 Alberta Scotties Tournament of Hearts final. Representing Alberta at the 2020 Scotties Tournament of Hearts, Walker led her team to a 3–4 record, failing to qualify for the championship round. It would be the team's last event of the season as both the Players' Championship and the Champions Cup Grand Slam events were cancelled due to the COVID-19 pandemic.

Due to the pandemic, the 2021 Alberta Scotties were cancelled, so Curling Alberta appointed the Walker rink to represent the province at the 2021 Scotties Tournament of Hearts. Walker's regular lead Nadine Scotland, who was three-months pregnant, opted not to play in the tournament, which was being held in a "bubble" due to the pandemic. She was replaced by Rachel Brown. Due to COVID restrictions, there was no one in attendance for the event, including family members, but Walker, was allowed to bring her five month-old son and her husband as a caregiver. Her son was the only baby in the "bubble". In the tournament itself, Walker led Alberta to a 9–3 round robin record, tied for third with Manitoba, skipped by Jennifer Jones. Walker beat Jones in the tiebreaker, but lost in the semifinal against the defending champion Team Canada rink, skipped by Kerri Einarson, settling for a bronze medal. Walker returned to the bubble in April 2021 as she was scheduled to spare for the Rachel Homan rink for the only two Grand Slam events of the abbreviated season. Up until the day the event started, Emma Miskew, Homan's third, was supposed to skip the team as Homan had just given birth to her second child three weeks earlier, with Walker substituting at third. However, Homan returned in time for the event, leaving the teams original lineup intact. The Homan rink won the 2021 Champions Cup and finished runner-up at the 2021 Players' Championship. Walker did not play in any games for the team.

In just their second event of the 2021–22 season, Team Walker reached the final of the 2021 Alberta Curling Series: Saville Shoot-Out where they were defeated by Kim Eun-jung. Due to the pandemic, the qualification process for the 2021 Canadian Olympic Curling Trials had to be modified to qualify enough teams for the championship. In these modifications, Curling Canada created the 2021 Canadian Curling Trials Direct-Entry Event, an event where five teams would compete to try to earn one of three spots into the 2021 Canadian Olympic Curling Trials. Team Walker qualified for the Trials Direct-Entry Event due to their CTRS ranking from the 2019–20 season. At the event, the team went 2–2 through the round robin, qualifying for the tiebreaker round where they faced British Columbia's Corryn Brown. After being defeated by Brown in the first game, Team Walker won the second tiebreaker to secure their spot at the Olympic Trials. The team had one more event before the Trials, the 2021 National Grand Slam, where they lost in the quarterfinals to Tracy Fleury. A few weeks later, they competed in the Olympic Trials, held November 20 to 28 in Saskatoon, Saskatchewan. At the event, the team had mixed results, ultimately finishing in sixth place with a 3–5 record.

A few weeks before the Alberta provincial championship, Team Walker won the Alberta Curling Series: Avonair tour event, defeating Casey Scheidegger in the final. They then competed in the 2022 Alberta Scotties Tournament of Hearts, where they posted a 6–1 record through the round robin. This created a three-way tie between Walker, Scheidegger and the Kelsey Rocque rink, however, as Walker had to best draw shot challenge between the three rinks, they advanced directly to the final. There, they met the Scheidegger rink, who defeated Rocque in the semifinal. After a tight final, Walker secured the victory for her team with a draw to the eight-foot to win 6–5. This qualified the team for their second straight national championship. At the 2022 Scotties Tournament of Hearts, the team could not replicate their success from 2021, finishing the round robin with a 3–5 record and missing the playoffs. Team Walker wrapped up their season at the 2022 Players' Championship where they missed the playoffs.

On March 17, 2022, the team announced that they would be disbanding at the end of the 2021–22 season. Walker then announced that she would be focusing solely on mixed doubles for the next Olympic quadrennial with partner Kirk Muyres.

Mixed doubles
In mixed doubles play, Walker usually plays with her husband Geoff Walker. At the 2016 Canadian Mixed Doubles Curling Trials the pair would make it all the way to the finals before losing to the Jocelyn Peterman / Brett Gallant duo. The pair played in the 2018 Canadian Mixed Doubles Curling Olympic Trials, where they made it to the playoffs, but were eliminated after winning two playoff games. With her husband playing in the 2018 World Men's Curling Championship, Walker had to find a new doubles partner in Kirk Muyres for the 2018 Canadian Mixed Doubles Curling Championship.  The pair found immediate success, winning the event, defeating Colton Lott and Kadriana Sahaidak in the final. The pair represented Canada at the 2018 World Mixed Doubles Curling Championship, where they won a bronze medal. They also represented Canada in the first leg of the 2018 Curling World Cup in Suzhou, China, which they would end up winning, defeating the United States (Korey Dropkin and Sarah Anderson) in the final. Following the 2021-22 season, Walker decided to focus her career strictly to the Mixed Doubles discipline with Muyres to push for an Olympic appearance in 2026.

Personal life

She is married to Geoff Walker of Team Gushue, and has two children. She is employed as a mortgage broker for Mortgage Design Group.

Year-by-year statistics

Team events

Mixed doubles

Teams

Grand Slam record

Former events

Notes

References

External links

 Laurier Athletics athlete profile
 CROCKER Laura – Athlete Information – 26th Winter Universiade – FISU site
 

1990 births
Living people
Canadian women curlers
Canadian mixed doubles curling champions
Curlers from Toronto
Curlers from Edmonton
Canada Cup (curling) participants